Ramulus westwoodii is a species of  stick insect first described by James Wood-Mason in 1873 and named in honour of John O. Westwood.

References

Phasmatodea
Insects of Asia
Insects described in 1873